Gunārs Skvorcovs (born 13 January 1990) is a Latvian ice hockey right winger, currently playing for Dinamo Riga of the Kontinental Hockey League (KHL).

Playing career
Skvorcovs made his debut for Metalurgs already in 2004-05, when he was only fourteen years old and continued to play in the club system for eight seasons. When in 2012-13 season Liepājas Metalurgs became affiliate of Dinamo Riga of KHL, Svorcovs made his debut in KHL. Eventually he split season between Dinamo and Metalurgs.

International play
Skvorcovs has played for Latvian national team in the 2008 U18 championship, as well as three World Juniors Championships.

References

External links

1990 births
Living people
People from Saldus
Dinamo Riga players
HC Kunlun Red Star players
Latvian ice hockey right wingers
HK Liepājas Metalurgs players